Tussock grassland is a form of open grassland that is dominated by tussock grasses (also called bunchgrasses). It is common in some temperate grasslands, savannas, and shrublands ecoregions of the Southern Hemisphere. Tussock grasslands are usually typified by low rainfall and poor soils in which few plants other than hardy tussock grasses can flourish. They are predominantly populated by tufted grasses of the genera Agrostis, Andropogon, Chionochloa, Deschampsia, Festuca, Koeleria, Pentameris and Poa. The grasslands are found in New Zealand, Australia, Argentina, temperate areas of southern and eastern Africa, and some subantarctic islands.

See also
 Tussock Grassland (Tanzania)
 Tussock grasslands of New Zealand

External links
Otago University, Department of Biology: The Conservation Status of NZ's Indigenous Tussock Grasslands
Te Ara:The encyclopedia of New Zealand: Tussock grasslands
Science Direct: Tussock Grassland

Temperate grasslands, savannas, and shrublands
Grasslands of Argentina
Grasslands of Australia
 
Grasslands of South Africa